Gibbs’ pipefish (Festucalex gibbsi) is a species of marine fish of the family Syngnathidae. It is found in the Western Pacific, from the Great Barrier Reef to Palau, the Chesterfield Islands and New Caledonia. Unconfirmed specimens have been reported off of the Seychelles in the Indian Ocean. It is expected to feed on small crustaceans, similar to other pipefish. This species is ovoviviparous, with males brooding eggs and giving birth to live young. The specific name honours P. E. Gibbs, who collected the type material.

Identifying Features

F. gibbsi is typically brownish, with a pale snout, tan and brown blotches on the head, and an indistinctly barred trunk. It often has an iridescent white bar below the opercular ridge, a brownish back and sides, and a brownish caudal fin with a pale margin.

References

Further reading

WoRMS

gibbsi
Marine fish
Fish described in 1977